Syllepte eriopisalis is a moth in the family Crambidae. It was described by Francis Walker in 1859. It is found on Borneo and in India.

The wingspan is about 34 mm. Adults are fuscous grey, the forewings with the base of the costa fuscous. There is an obliquely sinuous antemedial
fuscous line and a black speck in the cell. Both wings have a black discocellular lunule and postmedial minutely dentate fuscous line bent outwards between veins 5 and 2, then retracted to below the angle of the cell.

References

Moths described in 1859
eriopisalis
Moths of Asia
Moths of Borneo